Taur Mittran Di is a 2012 Punjabi drama action comedy film starring Amrinder Gill, Rannvijay Singh, Surveen Chawla, Amita Pathak and Mukesh Rishi. The movie is directed by Navaniat Singh and produced by Eros Entertainment & Jimmy Sheirgill Productions. The movie was released on 11 May 2012. This is the first film in the Punjabi film industry where the youth power and love for hockey is shown. Japji Khera did a cameo role in this film.

Cast
 Amrinder Gill as Himmat
 Rannvijay Singh as Ranbir
 Mukesh Rishi
 Surveen Chawla as Keerat
 Amita Pathak as Seerat
 Binnu Dhillon
 B.N. Sharma 
 Rana Ranbir
 Japji Khera as an item number

Crew

Director- Navaniat Singh

Producer- Jimmy Sheirgill

Writer- Dheeraj Rattan

DOP- Jitan Harmeet Singh

Costume- Rupa Chourasia

Sound- Joe Rodrigues & Abhijeet V. Sapre

Visual Effects- Rajesh Kaushik & Nilesh Uttarwar

Choreographer- Bhupi

Assistant Choreographer- Sahil dev & David

Soundtrack

References

2012 films
Punjabi-language Indian films
2010s Punjabi-language films
Films scored by Jaidev Kumar